Tillandsia stenoura is a species of flowering plant in the genus Tillandsia. This species is native to Bolivia and Ecuador.

References

stenoura
Flora of Bolivia
Flora of Ecuador